Midway is an unincorporated community in Roane County, Tennessee, United States. Midway does contain three schools: Midway Elementary School, Midway Middle School, and Midway High School.

References

Unincorporated communities in Roane County, Tennessee
Unincorporated communities in Tennessee